The Convention on the recognition of decisions recording a sex reassignment is a multilateral convention, drafted by the International Commission on Civil Status which provides the acceptance in other countries of decisions by the authorities (courts or administrative divisions) on a sex change. Sex changes of nationals or residents are recognized in the other member states if the sex change has been performed physically (and is recorded as such). This is registered in a change of the birth certificate.

Member states and signatories 
The convention has been ratified by Spain and the Netherlands. It has been signed but not ratified by Austria, Germany and Greece.

See also 
 International Commission on Civil Status

References

External links 
 treaty text
 ratifications and signatories

Human rights instruments
Treaties concluded in 2000
Treaties entered into force in 2011
Transgender law
International Commission on Civil Status treaties
Treaties of the Netherlands
Treaties of Spain
2000 in Austria
2000 in LGBT history
2011 in LGBT history